This list gives a geographical overview of all the worldwide locations of the Goethe-Institut.

Africa

North America

South America

Asia

Europe

Oceania

References

Cultural organisations based in Germany
German language